Rockism and poptimism are two ideological arguments about popular music prevalent in mainstream music journalism. Rockism is the belief that rock music is dependent on values such as authenticity and artfulness, and that such values elevate the genre over other forms of popular music. So-called "rockists" may promote the artifices stereotyped in rock music or may regard the genre as the normative state of popular music. Poptimism (or popism) is the belief that pop music is as worthy of professional critique and interest as rock music. Detractors of poptimism describe it as a counterpart of rockism that unfairly privileges the most famous or best-selling pop, hip hop, and R&B acts.

The term "rockism" was coined in 1981 by English rock musician Pete Wylie. It soon became a pejorative used humorously by self-described "anti-rockist" music journalists. The term was not generally used beyond the music press until the mid 2000s, partly due to the increasing number of bloggers who used it more seriously in analytical debate. In the 2000s, a critical reassessment of pop music was underway, and by the next decade, poptimism supplanted rockism as the prevailing ideology in popular music criticism.

While poptimism was envisioned and encouraged as a corrective to rockist attitudes, opponents of its discourse argue that it has resulted in certain pop stars being shielded from negative reviews as part of an effort to maintain a consensus of uncritical excitement. Others argue that the two viewpoints have similar flaws.

Historical context

Early rock criticism

Until the late 1960s, "pop" was considered to have the same definition as "rock" or "rock and roll". From the 1960s to the 1970s, music magazines such as Rolling Stone and Creem laid the foundation for popular music criticism in an attempt to make popular music worthy of study. Following the release of the Beatles' 1967 album Sgt. Pepper's Lonely Hearts Club Band, such magazines began drawing a contrast between "pop" and "rock" (with "rock and roll" now referring to the 1950s style), creating a division that gave generic significance to both terms.

"Pop" became associated with music that was more commercial, ephemeral, and accessible. "Rock" became associated with a style of music that was usually heavier and centered on the electric guitar. Besides general differences in musical style, the two words became associated with differing values. Many early rock reporters believed that rock embodied a particular set of values, such as rebelliousness, innovation, seriousness, and sociopolitical intent.

However, not all critics supported the idea of integrating high culture values into rock music, nor did they all argue for the importance of personal expression. In addition, some believed that such values were merely impositions of the cultural establishment. Nonetheless, a widespread belief among music critics in the 1960s and 1970s was that truly artistic music was made by singer-songwriters using traditional rock instruments on long-playing albums, and that pop hits reside on a lower aesthetic plane, a source of "guilty pleasure".

In an essay published in Ulrich Beck's Global America?: The Cultural Consequences of Globalization (2004), sociologist Motti Regev says the canonising of rock music in the 1960s and 1970s among professional critics had created a status structure and orthodoxy that carried over into other developments in popular music through the next century; as examples of this "continuous canonization" he cites Robert Christgau's series of decade-end "Consumer Guide" collections (for the 1970s, 1980s, and 1990s) and Colin Larkin's All Time Top 1000 Albums book.

New Pop

In the wake of the punk rock explosion of the late 1970s, the new wave and later post-punk genres emerged, informed by a desire for experimentation, creativity and forward movement. Music journalist Paul Morley, whose writing in British music magazine the NME championed the post-punk movement in late 1970s, has been credited as an influential voice in the development of New Pop following the dissipation of post-punk, advocating "overground brightness" over underground sensibilities. Around this time, the term "rockist" gained popularity to disparagingly describe music that privileged  traditionalist rock styles. According to Pitchforks Jess Harvel: "If new pop had an architect, it was Paul Morley."

Definitions and etymology

Rockism

"Rockism" was coined in 1981 when English rock musician Pete Wylie announced his Race Against Rockism campaign, an inversion of "Rock Against Racism". The term was immediately repurposed as a polemical label to identify and critique a cluster of beliefs and assumptions in music criticism. Paul Morley recalled: 

There is no widespread consensus for the definition of "rockism". During the 1990s, to be a "rockist" was defined as demanding a perception of authenticity in pop music despite whatever artifice is needed. In 2004, music critic Kelefa Sanneh offered a definition of rockists: "[S]omeone who reduces rock 'n' roll to a caricature, then uses that caricature as a weapon. Rockism means idolizing the authentic old legend (or underground hero) while mocking the latest pop star; lionizing punk while barely tolerating disco; loving the live show and hating the music video; extolling the growling performer while hating the lip-syncher." He further accused rockists of projecting a sexist, racist, and homophobic point of view.

Seattle Weeklys Douglas Wolk acknowledged the loose definition of rockism and proposed: "Rockism, let's say, is treating rock as normative. In the rockist view, rock is the standard state of popular music: the kind to which everything else is compared, explicitly or implicitly." PopMatters Robert Loss wrote that "traditionalism" describes the policing of the present with the past, making it a better word for "rockism". Design critic and indie pop musician Nick Currie (aka Momus) compared rockism to the international art movement Stuckism, which holds that artists who do not paint or sculpt are not true artists.

Poptimism 

Poptimism (also called popism), a portmanteau of pop and optimism, is a mode of discourse which holds that pop music deserves the same respect as rock music and is as authentic and as worthy of professional critique and interest. It positions itself as an antidote to rockism and developed following Carl Wilson's book about Celine Dion's album Let's Talk About Love and Sanneh's 2004 essay against rockism in The New York Times. In the article, Sanneh asks music listeners to "stop pretending that serious rock songs will last forever, as if anything could, and that shiny pop songs are inherently disposable, as if that were necessarily a bad thing. Van Morrison's Into the Music was released the same year as the Sugarhill Gang's 'Rapper's Delight'; which do you hear more often?" Loss cited Sanneh's article as "a sort of ur-text on poptimism", elaborating:

After Sanneh published his 2004 article, an argument about rockism developed in various web circles. In 2006, music journalist Jody Rosen noted the growing backlash against rock's traditional critical acclaim and the new poptimism ideology. By 2015, Washington Post writer Chris Richards wrote that, after a decade of "righteously vanquishing [rockism's] nagging falsehood", poptimism had become "the prevailing ideology for today’s most influential music critics. Few would drop this word in conversation at a house party or a nightclub, but in music-journo circles, the idea of poptimism itself is holy writ."

Criticism of poptimists

Overlap with rockism

In 2006, Morley derided the seriousness of contemporary music writers: "Many of the self-proclaimed American anti-rockists—or popists, or poptimists, or pop pricks—actually write with a kind of fussy, self-important rockist sheen. And for all their studious over-analysis, any definition of rockism is the same today as it's always been." That same year, Rosen spoke positively of the new movement but forewarned of possible excesses; that a hierarchy of music biased toward pop is no better than one biased toward rock because both genres have respectable qualities that cannot be ignored.

A week later, PopMatters Rob Horning responded to Rosen's writing with a more negative view of poptimism, writing that it is "sad to think the sharpest critics drowning in self-importance while believing they are shedding themselves of it. Basically by rejecting all that was once deemed important by a previous generation and embracing the opposite, you can make the case for your own importance. This is not optimism, it’s reaction."

Writing for The Quietus in 2017, Michael Hann argued that "the poptimists are just as proscriptive as the rockists", and listed the following as a few poptimist "sacred cows, which are beyond challenge":
 "The solo release by the member of a manufactured group is no longer the sad addendum to the imperial years; it is a profound statement of artistic integrity."
 "The surprise release by the big-name act is in itself, a revolutionary act."
 "To not care about Taylor Swift or Beyoncé or Lady Gaga or Zayn Malik is in itself questionable. It reveals not your taste in music, but your prejudices. In the worst-case scenario, you may be revealing your unconscious racism and sexism. At best, you're trolling."
 "Commercial success, in and of itself, should be taken as at least one of the markers of quality. After all, 50m Elvis fans can't be wrong."
 "Just as 'authenticity' is worthless as a symbol of a music's worth, so contrivance and cynicism might be elevated and celebrated, as evidence of the maker's awareness of the game they are playing."

According to Loss, rockism and poptimism are ultimately the same thing, and both rockists and poptimists treat music as a social commodity while mystifying the conditions in which music occurs. He adds that, as is common in "a culture wherein history isn't valued much", poptimism neglects its historical precedents. As it presents itself as a radical break in the discourse of popular culture, older rock critics and journalists are usually depicted as "a bunch of bricklayers for the foundations of the Rock and Roll Hall of Fame", a notion that Loss disputes: "Like film studies, rock criticism of the late '60s and the '70s was an attempt to make popular music worthy of study; it was poptimism before its day. It's somehow become generally accepted that rock criticism before the new millennium was overwhelmingly rockist."

Commercial bias
After the 2000s, the effects of poptimism attracted a belief that once a pop star reaches a certain level of stardom, many critics will safeguard them from negative reviews. Richards argued that poptimism cheerleads the already successful while privileging consensus and smothering dissent. New York Times Magazines Saul Austerlitz called poptimism a product of click-driven internet journalism that aspired to the lowest common denominator while being actively hostile to people who are fans of genres and bands associated with rockism. He further criticised it for allowing pop music fans to avoid expanding their taste and contrasted the types of music lauded by poptimists with the literature and film praised by book and film critics. "Should gainfully employed adults whose job is to listen to music thoughtfully really agree so regularly with the taste of 13-year-olds?"

Loss agreed with Austerlitz's text: "When [he] wrote that '(m)usic criticism's former priority—telling consumers what to purchase—has been rendered null and void for most fans. In its stead, I believe, many critics have become cheerleaders for pop stars,' I imagined an editor and a record label exec swooping down on him saying, 'Don't tell them that!' We like to believe criticism is devoid of crass commercialism, but Austerlitz gives away that it never was in the first place." He also noted a minuscule number of lowly-rated albums in publications such as Rolling Stone, Pitchfork, and PopMatters, and that "telling consumers what to purchase is still the point of a lot of music 'criticism'."

Hann says that when writers deal with "upmarket" readership, they "need to be able to justify your coverage, and that [means] thinkpieces hailing the cultural significance of the new pop stars. ... And once you've decided these subjects matter, it's hard to turn round and say: 'Actually, you know what? This isn't much cop.'" He recalls his experience as music editor for The Guardian, where he has "been commissioning those pieces, knowing they will be read ... if no one wanted to read about Taylor Swift, you would never see another thinkpiece about her. Instead, we enter an arms race of hyperbole, as we credit her with forcing Apple to change its streaming terms, dismantling the musical patriarchy, creating new paradigms in music and society."

In other fields

Flavorwires Elisabeth Donnely said that literary criticism "needs a poptimist revolution" in order to understand current literary phenomena such as Fifty Shades of Grey and better connect with the reading audience. In 2015, Salon published an article subtitled "Book criticism needs a poptimist revolution to take down the genre snobs", in which Rachel Kramer Bussell argued that book critics ignore often very good work and alienate readers by focusing only on genres considered "literary".

Writing for Salon in 2016, Scott Timberg commented on critics giving increasing amounts of respect to celebrity chef Guy Fieri, saying "Love or hate what is called poptimism, the impulse seems to be coming to food and restaurant criticism". Timberg likened food critics' "'in defense of [Fieri]' movement" to rock critics who "began writing apologias for Billy Joel and composed learned deconstructions of Britney Spears".

See also 

 Hierarchy of genres
 Honorific nicknames in popular music
 Classic rock
 Power pop
 Slutwave
 Middle of the road music
 "Writing about music is like dancing about architecture"

Notes

References

Further reading

External links 
 "Gallery of Rockism" in rockcritics.com

Rock music
Philosophy of music
Music criticism
1981 introductions
Pop music
1981 neologisms